Mihálygerge is a village in Nógrád County, Hungary with 585 inhabitants (2014). 

Populated places in Nógrád County